This is a list of public holidays in Mali.

Public holidays

References 

Malian culture
Mali
Holidays
Mali